Abu Abd al-Rahman Musa ibn Ulayy ibn Rabah al-Lakhmi (-779/80) was an Islamic scholar.

Career
Musa was born in North Africa to Ulayy ibn Rabah al-Lakhmi, an early hadith narrator and Umayyad confidant. His father's name had originally been Ali, but was changed to Ulayy in order to escape anti-Alid sentiment in the Umayyad era.

During his lifetime Musa narrated hadith on the authority of his father, as well as from Ibn Shihab al-Zuhri, Muhammad ibn Munkadir, Yazid ibn Abi Habib, Yazid ibn Abi Mansur, and Hibban ibn Abi Jabalah. He was considered a highly reliable (thiqa thiqa) hadith transmitter by the traditionalist Ahmad ibn Hanbal and "reliable, God willing" (thiqa-in-sha'a llah) by Ibn Sa'd.

In 772 Musa was selected by the terminally ill governor of Egypt, Muhammad ibn Abd al-Rahman al-Tujibi, to succeed him upon his death, and he was subsequently confirmed in that position by the Abbasid caliph al-Mansur. He remained as governor over the next six years, during which he put down a Coptic revolt near Rashid in 773, before being dismissed by the caliph al-Mahdi in 778.

He died in 779/780 in Alexandria.

Notes

References
 
 
 
 
 

 
 
 
 
 

707 births
780 deaths
8th-century Abbasid governors of Egypt
Abbasid governors of Egypt
8th-century Arabs
Taba‘ at-Tabi‘in hadith narrators